Juan Manuel Ruiz Saval (June 22, 1956 – June 23, 2009) was a Mexican stage, film and television actor who appeared in over twenty telenovelas. His best known role was opposite Victoria Ruffo in the telenovela Simplemente Maria.

Biography
Saval was the son of film actress and opera singer Manolita Saval and Manuel Ruiz. In 1983 he married Martha Eugenia Gallegos, with whom he had a son, Francisco.

Illness and death
In 2007 he was diagnosed with laryngeal cancer and had to retire from show business in order to seek surgery and treatment. While hospitalized for treatment in mid-2008, he contracted a rare infection associated with pneumonia and his condition worsened. In late December 2008, while in recovery from tracheal surgery at the Instituto Nacional de Cancerología in Mexico City, it was announced that recovery was going well and he might be able to return home for the holiday season. But by the third week of May, 2009, Saval had returned to the hospital and was reported to be in critical condition.

On his birthday in 2009, a gathering held in his honor was arranged by Adal Ramones and attended by his many friends. Because of his ill health, Saval was unable to attend, but a video connection was established between his home and the gathering. His friends remembered him for his great kindness and as always being an elegant person.

He died on June 23, 2009, one day after his 53rd birthday, after a three-year battle with cancer of the larynx, which he attributed to his smoking.

Career
Saval began his career in show business working on graphic novels. His screen debut was in the 1976 film El esperado amor desesperado with Sonia Furi and Ofelia Guilmain, and late in the 70s he performed in theater with his mother. His television debut was as Jorge in the 1980 telenovela Corazones sin rumbo.

Filmography

Television

 Corazones sin rumbo (1980) as Jorge
 Espejismo (1981) as Juan José
 Lo que el cielo no perdona (1982)
 Guadalupe (1984) as Roberto
 Los años felices (1984) as Rodolfo
 Principessa (1984) as Reynaldo
 Los años pasan (1985) as Rodolfo
 Juana Iris (1985)
 Muchachita (1986) as Chucho
 La pobre Señorita Limantour (1987) as Armando
 Simplemente María (1989) as Juan Carlos del Villar
 Mágica juventud (1992) as Javier
 María la del Barrio (1995) as Óscar Montalbán
 La antorcha encendida (1996) as José Manuel Fuentes
 Mujer, casos de la vida real (1998-2007)
 El diario de Daniela (1999) as Andres Zamora
 Rosalinda (1999) as Alfredo Del Castillo
 Carita de ángel (2000-2001) as Father Gabriel Larios
 Cómplices al rescate (2002) as Rolando Del Valle
 ¡Vivan los niños! (2002–2003) as Dr. Fernando Molina
 Corazones al límite (2004) as Osvaldo Madrigal
 Hospital el paisa (2004) as Dr. Manuel
Bajo el mismo techo (2005) as Carlos
 Sueños y caramelos (2005) as Augusto Monraz

Film
 El esperado amor desesperado (1976)

Theater
 Papacito piernas largas
 Gigi
 Ah que muchachita

References

External links
 

1956 births
Mexican male film actors
Mexican male telenovela actors
2009 deaths
Deaths from laryngeal cancer
Deaths from cancer in Mexico
Mexican male television actors